The 1989 San Francisco Bay Blackhawks season was the club's first overall, as they debuted in the Western Soccer League. The Blackhawks finished in first place in the North Division and reached the Final in the playoffs, getting past the Los Angeles Heat in the semis. The San Diego Nomads beat the Blackhawks in the final, 1-0.

Squad
The 1989 squad

Competitions

Western Soccer League

Match results

Season

Playoffs 

* = Penalty kicksSource:

Standings

References

External links
The Year in American Soccer – 1989 | WSL
San Francisco Bay Blackhawks Game Results | Soccerstats.us

American soccer clubs 1989 season
San Francisco Bay Blackhawks
San